William Heath was a soldier, farmer and politician.

William Heath may also refer to:

William Heath (artist) (1795–1840), British artist
William Womack Heath (1903–1971), American lawyer, educator, and diplomat
William Heath (died 1570), Member of Parliament for Ripon and Ludlow
William Heath (died 1607), Member of Parliament for Bath

See also
Bill Heath (disambiguation)
Heath (name)